Ugo Liberatore (26 September 1927 – 21 June 2012)) was an Italian screenwriter and film director. He contributed to more than forty films since 1960.

Selected filmography

References

External links 

1927 births
2012 deaths
Italian film directors
Italian screenwriters
Italian male screenwriters